Christopher Aubrey Shiflett (born May 6, 1971) is an American musician.  He is most recognizable as lead guitarist for the American rock band Foo Fighters.  He was previously a member of the punk rock bands No Use for a Name (1995–1999) and Me First and the Gimme Gimmes (1995–2019).  He joined the Foo Fighters in 1999 following the release of their third album There Is Nothing Left to Lose, and performed with the Foo Fighters and the Gimmes, as well as several other side projects, simultaneously.  He also hosts a podcast titled Walking the Floor and has released two solo albums, the most recent in 2019.

He is the younger brother of musician, Scott Shiflett, who has been the bassist in the punk rock band Face to Face since 1995.

Early life

Shiflett was born in Santa Barbara, California. When Shiflett was 11, he started learning how to play the guitar. A promising young soccer player, Shiflett played with the American Youth Soccer Organization (AYSO) from 1982—1984 under legendary coach Noemi Vazquez. Pressed to make a choice on his career, Shiflett joined his first band by the time he reached the age of 14. Shiflett is a supporter of Arsenal F.C.

Career

Shiflett began his music career in another band called Lost Kittenz with current members of Sugarcult. He later moved on to be the resident lead guitarist for the San Francisco Bay Area punk rock band No Use for a Name. When a friend announced that Guns N' Roses were auditioning for a guitarist, Shiflett asked his friend to instead get him an audition for the Foo Fighters, who after recording There Is Nothing Left to Lose as a trio held open auditions to hire another guitarist. Seeing an opportunity that he knew he could not pass up, he quickly parted ways with No Use for a Name to audition. His departure was abrupt, as his former band were just about to head out on tour in support of their album More Betterness!. He was replaced by Dave Nassie, who had previously contributed to Suicidal Tendencies' lead singer "Cyco" Mike Muir's solo projects.

Dave Grohl said part of his motivation to hire Shiflett was that he had a history in the underground punk scene, including opening for Grohl's former band Scream as bassist of the group Rat Pack. After being hired, Shiflett played on the tour for There Is Nothing Left to Lose, and all subsequent studio albums starting with One by One. Shiflett has noted several times that one of his favorite songs that he plays with the Foo Fighters is "All My Life" from their fourth studio album One by One. He has said that he was afraid of being fired even before he started to play with the band, as previous guitarist Pat Smear had asked to return. Smear eventually did rejoin the band as a touring rhythm guitarist in 2005, and finally as a full-fledged fifth member in 2010.

Side projects and cover bands

In addition to his full time duties with the Foo Fighters, Shiflett also plays in his own side-project, Jackson United, as well as Viva Death with his brother, Scott. For numerous projects, Shiflett performed under the name Jake Jackson. He played with the cover band Chevy Metal along with the late Foo Fighter Taylor Hawkins. They played songs from classic rock bands such as Black Sabbath, Queen, ZZ Top, and Rolling Stones.

Shiflett has a tattoo on the inside of his bottom lip with the words "Gimme Gimme", ostensibly as a tribute to his efforts with the cover band Me First and the Gimme Gimmes.

In 2009, Shiflett played in a band called The Real McCoy, which was founded by Andy McCoy, the guitarist of the former Finnish rock band Hanoi Rocks. The band split up after only three gigs.

In 2010 Shiflett created a new country-oriented side project, Chris Shiflett & the Dead Peasants, releasing a self-titled album in July. In 2011, Shiflett performed at the 2011 Wisconsin protests in Madison. He also performed at the Anti War rally for the A.N.S.W.E.R coalition (Act Now to Stop War and End Racism). Shiflett performed at the opening rally at the one and a half mile march from Hollywood and Vine to Hollywood and Highland March 19, 2011.

In 2013, Shiflett announced he would be releasing a new album from his country project, Chris Shiflett & The Dead Peasants, called All Hat And No Cattle. The album of honky-tonk covers and original tracks came out on July 30, 2013 via SideOneDummy Records.

April 2017 saw Shiflett release his first solo album West Coast Town, a  collection of original honky tonk tracks, accompanied by a short USA tour to promote the release.

A second solo album Hard Lessons was released on June 14, 2019. As with the first album Hard Lessons was produced by Dave Cobb.

Since October 2013, Shiflett has hosted the weekly podcast Walking The Floor with Chris Shiflett. As of August 2020, there have been over 170 episodes of Walking the Floor.

Chris will release his third album, Lost At Sea, in 2023 and will tour UK and Ireland in March 2023. "I am so excited to announce my upcoming tour of the UK & Ireland," Chris said. "The gigs I did over there in 2019 were some of the wildest, most rocking solo shows I've ever done, and I expect this one will be even better. We've got a bunch of new tunes to play, and we're fired up. See ya soon!!!"

Equipment

Guitars
Shiflett uses various Gibsons and Gretschs, but over the past few years has been using mostly Fender Telecasters,  Fender Telecaster Deluxes, and Fender Telecaster Thinlines. Shiflett also assembled some Telecaster Deluxes and Telecaster Thinlines out of Warmoth guitar parts with his tech. On the headstock of the Warmoth Telecasters, Shiflett's nickname "Shifty" replaces the Fender logo that would appear on a Telecaster created by Fender. He also has a signature Fender Telecaster Deluxe based on the Warmoth Telecasters, that is now his main guitar.
 Gretsch Brian Setzer Black Phoenix
 Gretsch ’59 Nashville reissue
 Gibson ES-135
 Gibson ES-347
 Gibson ES-335
 Gibson SG Custom
 Gibson Les Paul Traditional (Heritage Cherry Sunburst)
 Gibson Les Paul Custom
 Gibson Les Paul Goldtop
 Gibson Les Paul Junior
 Gibson Les Paul Standard
 Gibson Firebird
 Gibson Flying V
 Gibson Explorer
 Fender Chris Shiflett Telecaster Deluxe
 Fender Telecaster
 Fender Blacktop Telecaster
 Fender Telecaster Deluxe
 Duesenberg Fullerton TV
 Martin Acoustic guitar

Effects
 Strymon Timeline
 EHX Micro POG
 BOSS TU-3 Chromatic Tuner / Power Supply
 Dunlop DVP1 Volume pedal
 Whirlwind A/B Selector
 Line 6 M13 Stompbox Modeler (Wasting Light Tour)
 Boss DS-1 Distortion
 ProCo Rat Pedal
 Line 6 DL4 Delay Modeler
 Voodoo Labs Amp Selector
 LIne 6 MM4 Modulation Modeler
 Menatone Red Snapper
 Electro-Harmonix Holy Grail Pedal
 Fulltone Fulldrive 2 MOSFET
 Vox Input Selector/Jumper Switch
 Heptode Virtuoso Phase Shifter

Amplifiers
 Handwired Vox AC30
 Fender Bassman
 Fender Super Reverb
 Friedman BE-100
 Mesa/Boogie Road King

Discography

No Use for a Name
1997: Making Friends
1999: More Betterness!

Me First and the Gimme Gimmes

1997: Have a Ball
1998: Are a Drag
2001: Blow in the Wind
2001: Turn Japanese
2003: Take a Break
2004: Ruin Jonny's Bar Mitzvah
2006: Love Their Country
2008: Have Another Ball
2011: Go Down Under
2011: Sing in Japanese
2014: Are We Not Men? We Are Diva!

Foo Fighters

2002: One by One
2005: In Your Honor
2007: Echoes, Silence, Patience & Grace
2011: Wasting Light
2014: Sonic Highways
2015: Saint Cecilia (EP)
2017: Concrete and Gold
2021: Medicine at Midnight

Jackson United
2004: Western Ballads
2008: Harmony and Dissidence

Chris Shiflett & the Dead Peasants
2010: Chris Shiflett & the Dead Peasants
2013: All Hat and No Cattle

Chris Shiflett solo
2017: West Coast Town
2019: Hard Lessons
2023: Lost At Sea

Guest appearance
1997: Ten Foot Pole – Unleashed (additional guitar on "Denial", "What You Want" and "Pride and Shame")
1998: Swingin' Utters – Five Lessons Learned (lead guitar on "I Need Feedback" and "United 21")
2006: Viva Death – One Percent Panic
2007: Jesse Malin – Glitter In The Gutter (additional guitar on "Prisoners Of Paradise")

References

External links 

 Official website

American rock guitarists
American male guitarists
Foo Fighters members
Me First and the Gimme Gimmes members
Living people
1971 births
Grammy Award winners
No Use for a Name members
Viva Death members
Jackson United members
American Youth Soccer Organization players